Daniel Bryon Corkill (born March 8, 1974) is an American former child actor who saw early success in such films as Without a Trace and D.A.R.Y.L.. He appeared in a number of commercials and had a small part in the TV series Ryan's Hope. He was born in Park Ridge, Illinois, and, now retired from acting, lives in the St. Paul area.

Selected filmography

References

External links
 

1974 births
Living people
American male child actors
American male film actors
Male actors from Chicago
Actors from Park Ridge, Illinois